655 West Broadway (formerly First Allied Plaza, Advanced Equities Plaza and Broadway 655) is the 13th-tallest building in San Diego, California and is a prominent fixture in San Diego's skyline. It is located at 655 West Broadway in the Marina district of Downtown San Diego. 655 West Broadway is a 23-story building that uses the postmodern architectural style and was designed by Carrier Johnson Architects. It is primarily an office building but also contains residential and retail uses.

History
The construction of the  skyscraper began in 2003 and was completed in 2005. It was the first new office tower in downtown San Diego in a dozen years. The building was originally named Broadway 655. In 2007 Advanced Equities changed the name to Advanced Equities Plaza after signing a 10-year lease on the building. In August 2011 First Allied Securities split off from Advanced Equities via a sale of the company to its management, forming an independent brokerage. The building name changed again to First Allied Plaza in March 2012 due to the separation of First Allied from Advanced Equities. First Allied uses three floors of the 23-story skyscraper. The building is now referred to as "655 West Broadway". Other tenants include Deloitte Development LLC, Interlaced LLC and the law firm Robbins Geller Rudman and Dowd.

Ownership
The building was originally built by Broadway Tower 655, LLC, a limited partnership of which Robert V. Lankford of Lankford & Associates, Inc. was the managing partner. In July 2007, the building was sold to the Dutch firm Wereldhave USA under the direction of Carmen Taveras-Cruz, the company's former president for $210 million. Wereldhave sold the building in March 2013 to Lone Star Funds, a Dallas-based private equity firm, for a reported $140.88 million, representing a loss of over $70 million on Wereldhave's investment. The building was sold by Lone Star Funds in 2014 for $156.8 million to 655 WB Operating, LLC.

See also
List of tallest buildings in San Diego

References

External links 

655 West Broadway property website at 655WestBroadway.com
Advanced Equities Plaza at Emporis.com
Broadway 655 at SkyscraperPage.com

Office buildings completed in 2005
Residential buildings completed in 2005
Residential skyscrapers in San Diego
Skyscraper office buildings in San Diego